ADP-ribosyltransferase 5 is a protein that in humans is encoded by the ART5 gene.

Function

The protein encoded by this gene belongs to the ARG -specific ADP - ribosyltransferase family. Proteins in this family regulate the function of target proteins by attaching ADP -ribose to specific amino acid residues in their target proteins. The mouse homolog lacks a glycosylphosphatidylinositol-anchor signal sequence and is predicted to be a secretory enzyme. Several transcripts encoding different isoforms have been found for this gene. [provided by RefSeq, Jul 2014].

References

Further reading